References

1962 television seasons
1963 television seasons